The Langille Athletic Centre, otherwise known as the LAC, is the campus athletic centre/gym for Dalhousie's Agricultural College. It is located at 20 Cumming Drive, Bible Hill, NS. The facility is the hub for athletics on campus, as well as hosts exams and convocation every year. Athletics are an integral part of college life which the campus serves through the Langille Athletic Centre.

History
The Langille Athletic Center was completed in 1977 by Robert J. Flinn (1928-2018) of Halifax and the Robert J. Flinn Design Group. The building is faced with insulated precast concrete panels of aggregate rock which are attached to the walls as exterior cladding.  A unique design feature are the two 5' diameter circular bubble windows or plexiglass domes on the northeast facade. These include a 3" deep, 45 degree recessed aluminum frame which prevent water damage and create shadows on the building.  These two clear domes are repeated and contrasted in the two circular black ducts on the opposite southwest facade.  The building represents a historical context to Truro, Nova Scotia as well as institutional design and campus architecture. The Langille Athletic Center is an excellent example of that short and distinct transitional period between modernist and postmodenist architecture styles.

Originally called the Nova Scotia Agriculture College Athletic Centre, then named in honour of Mr. Winston Langille in 1991. Mr. Langille Studied Chemistry at Acadia University, earning a Bachelor of Science and then going on to earn a Master of Science from McGill University. Later in life he was awarded an Honorary Doctorate of Civil Laws from Acadia University. Mr. Langille taught Chemistry and Soil Science at the Dalhousie's Agricultural College (formerly Nova Scotia Agricultural College) until his retirement and was also heavily involved in coaching varsity teams for the college. Mr. Langille was also an avid athlete himself, playing everything from baseball, hockey, rugby, tennis, golf, and curling. Mr. Langille died in 2018 but will always be remembered at the Langille Athletic Centre for his contribution to the Dal AC campus.

Past and Present Athletic Directors for the Langille Athletic Centre include:

 Ken Marchant (1977- 1994)
 Judy Smith (1994- 2019)
 Andrew Harding (2019 – present)

Other staff members include the program/project assistant, the facility supervisor, custodians,  and a team of student staff consisting of Dal AC students.

Hours of operation

Varsity Teams 
The Langille Athletic Centre is home to a number of varsity sports teams which compete in their respective league and have won a number of notable titles since their conception. The mascot for the campus, as well as the Langille Athletic Centre is a ram, otherwise known as Rocky the ram

Men's and Women's Soccer 
Compete in the Atlantic Collegiate Athletic Association

 Men's Soccer Champions 1969/1970
 Men's Soccer Champions 1970/1971
 Men's Soccer Champions 1972/1973
 Women's Soccer Champions 1997/1998

Men's and Women's Basketball 
Compete in the Atlantic Collegiate Athletic Association

 Men's and Women's Basketball Champions 1976/1977
 Men's and Women's Basketball Champions 1977/1978
 Women's Basketball Champions 1979/1980
 Men's Basketball Champions 1980/1981
 Women's Basketball Champions 1982/1983
 Women's Basketball Champions 1995/1996

Women's Volleyball 
Compete in the Atlantic Collegiate Athletic Association

Men's and Women's Cross Country 
Compete in the Atlantic Collegiate Athletic Association

 Men's Cross Country Running Champions 1987/1988
 Men's Cross Country Running Champions 1988/1989
 Men's Cross Country Running Champions 2012/2013
 Women's Cross Country Running Champions 2016/2017
 Men's Cross Country Running Champions 2018/2019

Men's and Women's Badminton 
Compete in the Atlantic Collegiate Athletic Association

 Women's & Men's Badminton Champions 1979/1980
 Badminton Champions 1986/1987

Men's and Women's Woodsmen 
Compete in the Canadian Intercollegiate Lumber-jacking Association

 Women's Woodsmen Champions 2004/2005
 Women's Woodsmen Champions 2005/2006
 Men's and Women's Woodsmen Champions 2011/2012
 Men's and Women's Woodsmen Champions 2012/2013
 Men's and Women's Woodsmen Champions 2015/2016
 Men's Woodsmen Champions 2016/2017
 Women's Woodsmen Champions 2017/2018
 Men's and Women's Woodsmen Champions 2018/2019

Equestrian 
Compete in the Atlantic Intercollegiate Equestrian League * results data only available since the team became varsity in 2015/2016

 Grand Champions 2018/2019
 Grand Champions 2016/2017
 Grand Champions 2015/2016

Additionally, there have been a number of varsity sports team in the past that no longer exist on the Dal AC campus, these include:

Men's Hockey

Women's Field Hockey 

 Women's Field Hockey Champions 1975/1976
 Women's Field Hockey Champions 1978/1979

Men's Volleyball 

 Men's Volleyball Champions 1980/1981
 Men's Volleyball Champions 1996/1997
 Men's Volleyball Champions 1997/1998
 Men's Volleyball Champions 1998/1999

Men's and Women's Golf 

 Women's Golf Champions 2013/2014
 Women's Golf Champions 2014/2015

Women's Rugby 

 Women's Rugby Champions 2013/2014

The facility has also hosted a number of national championships for the varsity leagues

 National Badminton Host 1994
 National Basketball Host 1995
 National Volleyball Host 1996
 National Badminton Host 1999
 Men's Basketball Host 2002
 Women's Basketball Host 2003
 Women's Volleyball Host 2006
 Men's Basketball Host 2007
 Women's Basketball Host 2008
 Men's Basketball Host 2012
 Women's Basketball Host 2013

Facility Equipment 
The Langille Athletic Centre provides an extensive range of equipment and space for use for students and members of the community. The facility includes a full-sized outdoor soccer field, full-sized basketball court, with six retractable basketball nets and room for six badminton/Pickleball nets or two side-by-side volleyball nets, it also has a half-sized court used as a stage which has two basketball nets and room for one badminton/pickleball net or one volleyball net. There is also a free weight area for lifting weights which includes a functional fitness room fitted with various plyometric/calisthenics equipment and a cardio area fitted with treadmills, bikes, ellipticals, a stair mill, rower and assistive weight machines. There are also two squash courts and one racquetball court available for use and all necessary sports equipment is available for loan at the facility. Additionally, there are gendered full-sized locker rooms including washrooms and showers for the facility users.

Memberships 
Memberships are available to the community for purchase with many different membership options including discounts for non-Dal AC students, Dal AC faculty, Dal AC alumni and seniors. In addition to regular memberships, there are also 1-month memberships, 10 visit punch passes, and drop in rates available. Memberships for current Dal AC students is included in their college tuition.

Special Programs and Event

Programs 
The Langille Athletic Centre has a number of special programs offered for students and members with many more short-term programs occurring frequently. Established programs include

 The Legge Massage Therapy office which operates out of the facility
 The Free Wheelin’ Program which is a bike rental program free of charge with a required deposit
 Fitness classes (offered based on availability and attendance)
 Intramurals such as PHAT boys basketball and pickleball.

Events 
Special events that are hosted annually are:

 Convocation
 Rocky's Run which is a 5 km run available for not only members and students, but also the broader community, and is the largest fundraiser supporting the facility
 The Christmas Craft Market
 Agri-Golf Classic

The facility also plays host for a number of events such as badminton provincials and other local sporting groups during the year.

References 

Dalhousie University campus